Marysole Wörner Baz (born August 17, 1936 in Mexico City - June 22, 2014) was a Mexican painter, engraver and sculptor.

Life
She was born in Mexico City. As a child her parents gave her pens to sketch with, because a pencil can be erased and corrected. She had and did not want any formal training.

She initially launched her career in Paris and she received some attention. She was self-taught and she mixed with older foreign artists that kept her up to date with Mexican visual arts. It also gave her the chance to develop a style quite different from other contemporary artists.

Baz's contemporaries included the “Generación de la Ruptura” including Manuel Felguérez, Vicente Rojo Almazán, Lilia Carrillo and Alberto Gironella. However she was more akin to the European artists living in Mexico, like Leonora Carrington, Remedios Varo, Vlady, Mathias Goeritz, Francisco Moreno Capdevilla and Benito Messeguer.

Her success and her expanding knowledge of different media—from painting to drawing and sculpture was limited by her alcoholism. Rehabilitation in the early seventies gave her access to exhibitions in the (Palacio de Bellas Artes, Museo de Arte Moderno, Museo Universitario del Chopo and to international collectors.

From her first individual exhibition, in 1955, and throughout her more than five decades work, she explored diverse media, kinetic art and installation art.

Baz died in 2014.

References

External links
 Additional info and gallery

1936 births
Living people
Mexican sculptors
20th-century Mexican painters
21st-century Mexican painters
20th-century sculptors
21st-century sculptors
Mexican women painters
Artists from Mexico City
20th-century Mexican women artists
21st-century Mexican women artists
Mexican people of German descent